Kwon So-hee (born March 8, 1994), known professionally as Sogumm (stylized in all lowercase), is a South Korean singer-songwriter. In 2019, she released albums Not My Fault and Sobrightttttttt, which were met with critical acclaim. She won Signhere and signed to AOMG in the same year. She won Rookie of the Year at the Korean Music Awards in 2020 and released her second studio album Precious in 2021.

Early life 
Kwon So-hee was born on March 8, 1994, in Daejeon. As she lived in China when she was in the fifth grade, she listened to songs by foreign artists. She became interested in music after discovering Michael Jackson. She started making music in high school, but only began to compose songs from the heart after moving to Seoul when she was 23. She worked for an OST-making company but quit her job in 2017 because she could not write the music she wanted to make. She began uploading her music to SoundCloud and later joined Balming Tiger.

She adopted the stage name "Sogumm" because it was her nickname in middle school.

Career 
In 2018, Sogumm released her debut single "Suicide" with rapper Tnom. In September 2019, she released collaborative album Not My Fault with music producer Dress. In October 2019, she released her debut studio album Sobrightttttttt. Both albums received critical acclaim. In November 2019, Sogumm won Signhere and signed to AOMG. In 2020, she won Rookie of Year at the Korean Music Awards. In 2021, she released her second studio album Precious which received critical acclaim. In 2023, she departed from AOMG as her contract expired.

Artistry 
Sogumm is known for her unique singing style. The Hankyoreh wrote that "she recites verses in a relaxed tone similar to that of "singing rap". She also pronounces words unclearly and goes offbeat, which gives the impression that she is drunk or sleepy." Lyrically, Bandwagon praised her "straightforward and vivid storytelling."

Sogumm describes her music as "deficiency" because she expresses the feelings from the deficiency of life and implies her belief of trying to grow through deficiency in her music. In terms of genre, she describes it as alternative pop. She was influenced by female R&B singers such as Beyoncé and Alicia Keys. She usually gets inspiration from her daily life, love, and nature.

Discography

Studio albums

Collaborative album

Singles

Filmography

Television

Awards and nominations

References

External links 
 

1994 births
Living people
People from Daejeon
South Korean women singer-songwriters